The Las Vegas metropolitan area is home to many sports, most of which take place in the unincorporated communities around Las Vegas rather than in the city itself. The Las Vegas Valley has three major league professional teams: the Vegas Golden Knights of the National Hockey League (NHL), which began play in 2017 as the region's first major pro team, the Las Vegas Raiders of the National Football League (NFL) which began play in 2020 after relocating from Oakland, California, and the Las Vegas Aces of the Women's National Basketball Association (WNBA). Las Vegas is home to four minor league sports teams: the Las Vegas Aviators of the Pacific Coast League (Minor League Baseball), the Las Vegas Lights FC of the USL Championship, the league at the second level of the U.S. men's soccer league system, the Henderson Silver Knights of the American Hockey League, the league at the second level of the National Hockey League (NHL), and the Vegas Vipers of the XFL. The Las Vegas Lights and Vegas Vipers are currently the only teams playing in the City of Las Vegas, at the city-owned Cashman Field.

The University of Nevada, Las Vegas (UNLV), located just off the Las Vegas Strip in Paradise, fields National Collegiate Athletic Association (NCAA) Division I athletic teams. Allegiant Stadium, located in Paradise, hosts UNLV football and the Las Vegas Bowl, an annual NCAA bowl game. The Las Vegas Motor Speedway (LVMS) just north of the city hosts NASCAR's Cup Series and other automotive events. The Professional Rodeo Cowboys Association's National Finals Rodeo is held annually at the Thomas & Mack Center on the UNLV campus, and the Professional Bull Riders holds its annual Team Series Championship at T-Mobile Arena on the Strip.

Visitors and residents also have many options for boating, golf, hiking, rock climbing. The city has many parks which offer a wide range of activities.

List of teams

Major professional teams

Minor professional teams

Amateur teams

College teams

History
Las Vegas was one of the largest cities in the United States without a major league sports team prior to the entry of the Golden Knights into the NHL. Due in part to perceived risks with legal sports betting, no major professional sports league had ever had a team in Las Vegas until the NHL announced its intent to launch an expansion team in the city in June 2016, though the NBA's Utah Jazz played 11 home games at the Thomas & Mack Center in the 1983–84 season. The placement of a major league team in Las Vegas was an ongoing topic of discussion between city leaders and the professional sports leagues.

Past issues with major league sports

Historically, the most prominent issue with sports in Las Vegas was the perceived problem of legal sports betting. Traditionally, all four major professional sports leagues had strong anti-gambling policies, prohibiting their personnel from having any involvement in gambling. The NFL took the toughest stance, even refusing to accept Las Vegas tourism advertising for Super Bowl telecasts and threatening to file suit against any local hotels holding Super Bowl parties. Hotels got around the legal threat by referring to the Super Bowl as "The Big Game" rather than its actual name in advertising. In addition, some potential owners believed a professional sports franchise would have difficulty gaining an audience, given Las Vegas's numerous entertainment options. A number of prior professional football teams in the city ranked at or near last in their leagues in attendance over the years, such as the Las Vegas Posse (Canadian Football League), the Las Vegas Locomotives (United Football League) and the Las Vegas Outlaws (Arena Football League). Las Vegas also has a high percentage of residents working in 24-hour occupations, many of whom work nights and weekends when most games would be played. The Las Vegas area also has a  rather transient population, with a significant percentage of its residents being transplants, many of whom are loyal to the teams from their former cities and/or states, causing doubts that a professional sports team could gain an audience.
 
Several owners of other sports franchises disagreed. Miami Marlins owner Jeffrey Loria described Las Vegas as "a potential gold mine" for a professional sports team owner. Dallas Mavericks owner Mark Cuban was also quoted saying that Las Vegas would be a good professional sports town.

As the four leagues embraced daily fantasy sports (DFS) and various forms of both online and retail gambling such as state lotteries, Native American gaming and online/mobile sports betting became more prevalent, the ethical arguments that the four major leagues used to justify excluding Las Vegas from professional sports gradually weakened and the doors opened to major pro sports in the market; NBA Commissioner Adam Silver said he was in favor of regulated, legalized sports gambling. The NHL became the first of the four professional sports leagues to land in Vegas, with the Vegas Golden Knights expansion team commencing play in October 2017. The NFL, once a staunch opponent of Las Vegas, became the second of the four leagues to come to Vegas with the relocation of the Raiders to the area from Oakland, California in 2020.

Prior to the opening of T-Mobile Arena in April 2016, another major obstacle was the lack of suitable facilities. The city did not have a facility that was large enough or modern enough to host an MLB or NFL team. While the Thomas & Mack Center and MGM Grand Garden Arena were large enough on paper to host an NBA or NHL team, they were only suitable for temporary use due to age and/or design issues.

Harrah's Entertainment and the Anschutz Entertainment Group committed to building a new arena on a parcel of land behind Harrah's Paris and Bally's off the Strip, to be built to NHL and NBA standards. The arena was expected to open in the fall of 2010, but construction never began. Harrah's Entertainment CEO Gary Loveman said in a June 2009 article in the Las Vegas Business Press that his company was still committed to building the arena, but it was delayed by a lack of financing. On April 6, 2010, the Las Vegas Review-Journal reported that three proposals had been made to build an arena of approximately 20,000 seats on or near the Strip to host professional basketball and hockey, rodeo, concerts and other events. All three proposals called for public money to be used for a portion of the construction cost. On November 5, 2013, Las Vegas news media reported plans for a joint-venture arena to be built on the Strip with the backing parties being AEG and MGM Resorts. Located at a former parking lot at the back of the Monte Carlo, T-Mobile Arena seats 20,000 and costs $350 million. Ground was broken in May 2014, with its opening on April 6, 2016.

Cashman Field was replaced as a baseball venue by Las Vegas Ballpark in Summerlin in 2019 with Cashman being converted to full time soccer use. Sam Boyd Stadium was replaced by Allegiant Stadium, which became the home of the Las Vegas Raiders and the UNLV Rebels football team beginning in 2020. Ground was broken for Allegiant Stadium on November 13, 2017, with its opening taking place on July 31, 2020.

Major league professional teams

National Hockey League

Las Vegas is the home to the Vegas Golden Knights of the National Hockey League (NHL). The Golden Knights are owned by Black Knight Sports & Entertainment, a consortium led by Bill Foley, and play at T-Mobile Arena. The Golden Knights began play during the 2017–18 NHL season and became the first major league professional team in Las Vegas. The Golden Knights also became the first NHL expansion team since the St. Louis Blues to reach the Stanley Cup Finals in their first season only to lose to the Washington Capitals.

Prior to the Golden Knights, the National Hockey League had experience with Las Vegas beginning in 1991, when an outdoor game was held in Las Vegas, with the Los Angeles Kings facing the New York Rangers outside Caesars Palace in a preseason exhibition game. It carried thorough the years with an annual preseason exhibition game called Frozen Fury which was held at the MGM Grand Garden Arena. The league has also held the NHL Awards ceremonies after each season since 2009.

National Football League

Las Vegas is home to the Las Vegas Raiders of the National Football League (NFL). The Raiders are controlled by principal owner and managing general partner Mark Davis and began play in Las Vegas in 2020. On March 27, 2017, NFL owners voted 31–1 to approve the Oakland Raiders' move to Las Vegas, though the team continued to play at the Oakland–Alameda County Coliseum in Oakland until their new stadium, Allegiant Stadium, was built in time for the 2020 NFL season.

Prior to the Raiders, professional outdoor football had been attempted three times in the area. The first two attempts, the XFL's Las Vegas Outlaws and the Canadian Football League's Las Vegas Posse, were unsuccessful, with both teams folding after only one season of play. The XFL folded outright, while the Posse were a failure at the box office, part of the CFL's failed U.S. expansion attempt. A third attempt at professional football was begun in the fall of 2009 with the United Football League's Las Vegas Locomotives; however, the franchise and the league folded in 2012. The Locomotives played in the league's first three championship games, winning the first two in 2009 and 2010. The first professional football game ever held in Las Vegas was an American Football League preseason contest between the Raiders and Houston Oilers in 1964.

Allegiant Stadium will host Super Bowl LVIII in 2024.

Women's National Basketball Association
In October 2017, multiple national media outlets reported that Spurs Sports & Entertainment, owner of the San Antonio Spurs of the National Basketball Association (NBA) and its Women's National Basketball Association (WNBA) sister team, the San Antonio Stars, had reached an agreement to sell the Stars to a Las Vegas-based group that would move the team to the area effective with the 2018 season. The NBA and WNBA officially approved the sale on October 17, 2017, and announced the Las Vegas Aces would play at the Mandalay Bay Events Center, now known as Michelob Ultra Arena, starting in the 2018 season.

During the 2022 season, the Aces defeated the Phoenix Mercury in round 1 and the Seattle Storm in the semifinals before deafeating the Connecticut Sun in the 2022 WNBA Finals in 4 games to win the franchise's first championship and the first professional sports championship for Las Vegas.

Proposed major league teams

Major League Baseball
In April 2004, Major League Baseball (MLB) Commissioner Bud Selig publicly revealed that baseball was considering Las Vegas as a potential home for the Montreal Expos. The lack of a baseball park that could be quickly reconfigured for Major League Baseball cost the city any chance of landing the team. Baseball eventually chose Washington, D.C., primarily because the city agreed to provide a new stadium built entirely with public funding.

A news item on a local television station dated August 26, 2010 reported that then Mayor Oscar Goodman was still actively pursuing a Major League Baseball franchise for the city. He was reportedly rebuffed by the owner of an unnamed team due to the small size of the market and the weak local economy.

In 2021, the Oakland Athletics began researching the possibility of relocating to the Las Vegas area if their proposed ballpark at Howard Terminal to replace the decrepit Oakland Coliseum in Oakland, California was not approved by the city government. If the relocation occurred it would be the first time two major league sports teams from one city both relocated to the same city (and, in fact, the same venue) as the Raiders also relocated from Oakland to Las Vegas due to similar concerns over the Oakland Coliseum and the inability to reach a deal for a football-only stadium in the East Bay. Coincidentally, the Athletics played six home games at Cashman Field during the 1996 MLB season when the renovations for the Coliseum were not yet complete. Las Vegas was also previously considered as a relocation site for the Arizona Diamondbacks with the team signing a non-disclosure agreement with officials on a new retractable roof ballpark in the suburb of Henderson under the codename "Project Marble" in 2018 only for the negotiations to stall and the team to focus on staying in the Phoenix metropolitan area.

National Basketball Association
Rumors surfaced in 2005 about the possible relocation of the National Basketball Association's (NBA)  Sacramento Kings to Las Vegas. In November 2006, California voters rejected a proposal to fund a new arena in Sacramento, considered to be a condition of the team remaining there. Another possible factor was that the owners of the Kings, the Maloof family, also owned the Palms Casino Resort in Las Vegas. Changes in the Kings owners' financial situation led to a decision to sell the club to a group planning to keep the team in Sacramento, which finalized the purchase of the Kings in May 2013.

The Milwaukee Bucks had also been mentioned as possible candidates for relocation to Las Vegas, as were the Seattle SuperSonics before their relocation to Oklahoma City.

Former UNLV and NBA player Jackie Robinson has been working to build the All Net Resort and Arena, a $1.4 billion privately funded complex encompassing an arena, hotel and shopping project near the SLS Las Vegas and Turnberry Towers that could attract an NBA franchise to Las Vegas. The arena itself would cost $670 million, being operated by Comcast-Spectacor (owners of another NBA stadium, Philadelphia's Wells Fargo Center). Designed by the Cuningham Group, the arena was planned to open in 2017. The All Net Arena saw its groundbreaking ceremony on October 29, 2014, and Robinson entered into negotiations with Clark County expecting to begin construction by Fall 2015. However, the plan was placed on hold in 2016 due to financing problems.

Las Vegas hosted the 2007 NBA All-Star Game, the only time the event has been held in a non-NBA city. As part of the conditions the NBA set for holding the game in Las Vegas, sports books agreed not to take bets on the game. The NBA Summer League is currently held in Paradise, Nevada. The 2008 and 2012 United States men's Olympic basketball teams trained in Las Vegas, and played a game at the Thomas & Mack Center against the Dominican Republic.

In October 2016, during an interview with KNPR's State of Nevada,  MGM Resorts International CEO Jim Murren said he was working on bringing an NBA team to Las Vegas, to play at the T-Mobile Arena, adding that it would most likely be through the relocation of an existing team rather than through expansion. By 2022, Las Vegas became one of the two most discussed markets with potential to be awarded an expansion franchise (along with Seattle) with Los Angeles Lakers player LeBron James expressing interesting in owning an expansion franchise in the Las Vegas Valley. Las Vegas mayor Carolyn Goodman expressed her confidence in the city being the location of an NBA team.

Major League Soccer
The local media reported in the summer of 2008 that Las Vegas was on the short list of cities Major League Soccer (MLS) was considering for an expansion franchise in the near future.  After a controversial campaign by Mayor Carolyn Goodman and Cordish Company to use public dollars for a new taxpayer-funded stadium, the proposal faced public backlash before MLS ultimately decided to pass on Las Vegas in February 2015.

Minor league professional teams

Baseball

Las Vegas is home to the Las Vegas Aviators of the Pacific Coast League (AAA), who play at Las Vegas Ballpark. The park is in a part of Summerlin that lies outside the Las Vegas city limits. Established in 1983, the team had previously played as the Las Vegas Stars from 1983 until 2000 and later the Las Vegas 51s from 2001 until 2018 at Cashman Field until the opening of their new ballpark in 2019. The Aviators are currently the AAA affiliate of the Oakland Athletics.

When the team came to Las Vegas in 1983 they became the first professional sports team to play in Las Vegas since the Las Vegas Wranglers baseball club who played from 1947 to 1952 and 1957 to 1958.

Soccer
Beginning in 2018, Las Vegas became home to a USL Championship soccer team known as the Las Vegas Lights FC. The team plays at Cashman Field , and in its first season became the second team to play within the Las Vegas city limits. Following the 51s' rebranding as the Aviators and move to the new ballpark, Lights FC were the only professional team that plays within the city limits until the arrival of the XFL (2020) Vegas Vipers beginning in 2023, who share the stadium with the Lights.

Hockey

In 2020, the Las Vegas area became home of an American Hockey League franchise when the San Antonio Rampage relocated to the market as the Henderson Silver Knights. The team which is minor league affiliate of the Golden Knights played in Orleans Arena until a Dollar Loan Center was constructed in Henderson.

Previously the Las Vegas area had minor hockey teams in the Las Vegas Thunder of the International Hockey League and later Las Vegas Wranglers of the ECHL.

Arena Football
In 2022, the Vegas Knight Hawks of the Indoor Football League began play at Dollar Loan Center. The Knight Hawks are owned by Vegas Golden Knights owner Bill Foley.

Previously, Las Vegas was home to the Las Vegas Sting, Las Vegas Gladiators, and Las Vegas Outlaws, all from the also defunct Arena Football League.

Minor league sports issues
Cashman Field, the former home of the team now known as the Aviators, was built in 1983, and saw few upgrades during its time as a minor league ballpark. After the toilets backed up during a 2015 game, PCL president Branch Barrett Rickey wrote a letter to the Las Vegas Convention and Visitors Authority to warn that the upgrades needed to keep Cashman at something approaching Triple-A standards would require spending "tens of millions of dollars." Rickey added that even that wouldn't be enough, as many experts inside and outside Las Vegas believed that Cashman was at the end of its useful life.

Because it lagged so far behind most other facilities in AAA baseball there was danger that Las Vegas would lose its place in minor league baseball's top tier (which happened to Portland after the 2010 season when plans for a new park fell through). Dissatisfaction with the facilities, along with the lack of a plan to improve the situation, was cited as a major reason that the Los Angeles Dodgers did not renew their working agreement with the then-Las Vegas 51s after it expired in 2008. The Dodgers resumed what had been a long-term affiliation with Albuquerque, where a new ballpark opened in 2003. The now-Aviators opened Las Vegas Ballpark in Summerlin in 2019, which is considered a top facility in Minor League Baseball.

In 1999, UNLV officials refused to discuss a new agreement with the owners of the Las Vegas Thunder of the International Hockey League to play at the Thomas & Mack Center. Hotels with facilities suitable for the Thunder would not commit to an entire hockey season, as this would have seriously restricted the dates available for concerts and other events. This left the Thunder without a place to play. The team was disbanded, and the city lost hockey for four years. Only the opening of the Orleans Arena (considerably smaller than the Thomas & Mack) at the off-Strip Orleans Hotel allowed for the return of hockey with the Las Vegas Wranglers of the ECHL. The ECHL is considered two steps below the NHL, or the equivalent of the 'AA' level in minor league baseball. The Wranglers ceased operations after the 2013–14 season after Orleans Hotel owners Boyd Gaming informed the team that their lease at the Orleans Arena would not be renewed, and efforts to find a new location failed.

The Las Vegas Locomotives began play in October 2009 in the inaugural season of the United Football League. The Locos played in the first three UFL championship games, winning the first two against the Florida Tuskers, while losing the 2011 edition to the relocated Tuskers, then the Virginia Destroyers. The head coach was Jim Fassel, former head coach of the NFL's New York Giants. The team played home games at UNLV's Sam Boyd Stadium. The league suspended operations in the middle of the 2012 season, with Las Vegas undefeated through the first four games. Las Vegas, despite being the league's best and most consistent team on the field, was also consistently one of the poorest draws at the gate in the league; their final home game drew only 600 fans into the stadium, a league record low.

Af2, a second-tier arena football league, announced on June 24 that the ArenaCup, the league championship game, would be played in Las Vegas at the Orleans arena on August 22, 2009.  Af2 President Jerry Kurz stated that the league had serious plans to put a team in Las Vegas to play at the Orleans Arena. He said that he had "no qualms" about this even given the problems that the Las Vegas Gladiators of the Arena Football League had in the city. This turned out to be the last season of af2 due to the demise of its parent league, the original Arena Football League.

In 2005–06, the city hosted ArenaBowl XIX and ArenaBowl XX at the Thomas & Mack Center, the AFL's first neutral-site title games. After two years of disappointing attendance the game was moved.

Former professional teams

College sports

The University of Nevada, Las Vegas (UNLV) Rebels (the name Runnin' Rebels is used only by the men's basketball team) host Mountain West Conference events on the UNLV campus and at Allegiant Stadium. Indoor sporting events are held at the Thomas & Mack Center complex, both at the main arena and at Cox Pavilion, a smaller arena attached to the complex.

The College of Southern Nevada (CSN) Coyotes host Scenic West Athletic Conference events on the CSN campus at William R. Morse Stadium and at Heritage Park both in Henderson.

The city has become a regional hub for college basketball conference tournaments. The Mountain West Conference (MW) holds its annual tournaments for both men and women at the Thomas & Mack Center. Las Vegas hosted the tournaments for the first seven years of the MW's existence, with the tournaments returning to Las Vegas in 2009 after three years in Denver. In 2009 the West Coast Conference, which does not have a team in Nevada, moved its men's and women's tournaments to the Orleans Arena. The Western Athletic Conference moved both of its tournaments to Las Vegas in 2011. The WAC also plays at the Orleans Arena.

On March 14, 2012, the Las Vegas Review-Journal reported that the Pac-12 Conference was moving its men's basketball conference tournament to Las Vegas in 2013, to be played at the MGM Grand Garden Arena. The tournament remained at this venue through the 2016 edition, after which it moved to T-Mobile Arena. The Pac-12 has since moved its women's tournament from its most recent site in Seattle to Las Vegas, originally at MGM Grand Garden Arena and now at Michelob Ultra Arena. Most recently, the Big West Conference moved its men's and women's tournaments to the area starting in 2020–21, first at Michelob Ultra Arena in 2021 and then Dollar Loan Center from 2022.

Las Vegas hosts the Las Vegas Bowl, a college bowl game, around Christmas Day. The game pairs a Pac-12 team against either a SEC team or Big Ten team.

Despite the state of Nevada having no collegiate wrestling itself, many of the most prestigious college wrestling events are held in the area each year. The Cliff Keen Las Vegas Invitational tournament has been held in the city since 1981. Some of the nations best wrestling teams, such as Michigan, Nebraska, Virginia Tech, Minnesota, Iowa State, Ohio State and Northern Iowa often attend the event. Nearby Reno, also holds a huge wrestling tournament every year for both collegiate and high school wrestling known as The Reno Tournament of Champions.

Vegas has also been home to many international amateur wrestling events. In 2015, Vegas held the World Wrestling Championships at Orleans Arena.

Rugby union and variations

The Las Vegas Blackjacks RFC are a rugby union team that compete in the Southern California Rugby Football Union.

The USA Sevens, the largest annual rugby tournament in North America, was in Sam Boyd Stadium from 2010 until 2018. The tournament had been held in late January or early February until 2016, when it moved to its current date of the first full weekend in March. The USA Sevens, one of the events in the annual World Rugby Sevens Series rugby sevens circuit, moved to Las Vegas from San Diego, where it had previously been held.  The 2012 USA Sevens drew over 64,000 fans to the stadium and was broadcast live on NBC. The Sevens World Series is an annual series of tournaments for national sevens teams, with most events featuring 16 teams competing for two distinct trophies.

The 2017 edition saw the addition of the USA Women's Sevens to the tournament weekend, also at Sam Boyd Stadium. The USA Women's Sevens has been part of the World Rugby Women's Sevens Series since the circuit's creation in 2012–13; its first edition had been held in Houston before moving to suburban Atlanta for its next three editions. However, 2017 was the only year in which Las Vegas hosted a women's tournament. The USA Women's Sevens was not held in the 2017–18 season, being superseded by the 2018 Rugby World Cup Sevens in San Francisco. While that event resumed in the 2018–19 season, it was moved to Denver.

In February 2020, five Major League Rugby games were held at Sam Boyd Stadium.

Special sports events
The NASCAR Cup Series has drawn up to 165,000 fans. Las Vegas also hosts a significant number of professional fights. Many of these fights (such as those in MMA's UFC) take place near downtown or on the Strip in one of the major resort/hotel/casino event centers. Mandalay Bay is frequently a top contender as a venue for the UFC.

Las Vegas submitted a bid to host the 2020 Summer Olympics, but did so without United States Olympic Committee (USOC) consent. The International Olympic Committee (IOC) requires that a national Olympic committee nominates a city within their country followed by the submission of the bid to the IOC. The USOC stated that they would not submit a 2020 bid. Las Vegas proceeded without USOC support. The IOC reportedly rejected the bid. The day after the September 1, 2011 deadline for bidding, the IOC revealed the six applicant cities and Las Vegas was not one of them.

Individual sports

Boxing
Las Vegas is host to many professional boxing matches and has hosted many championship bouts, including the following notable bouts:
Larry Holmes vs. Muhammad Ali (1980)
The Battle of the Little Giants (1981)
Sugar Ray Leonard vs. Thomas Hearns (1981, 1989)
Larry Holmes vs. Gerry Cooney (1982)
Marvin Hagler vs. Thomas Hearns (1985)
Julio César Chávez vs. Meldrick Taylor aka Thunder Meets Lightning (1990)
Julio César Chávez vs. Héctor Camacho Sr. (1992)
Michael Carbajal vs. Humberto González I (1993)
Oscar De La Hoya vs. Julio César Chávez (1996, 1998)
The Bite Fight (1997)
Fight of the Millennium (1999)
Lennox Lewis vs. Evander Holyfield II (1999)
Barrera vs. Morales trilogy (2000, 2002, 2004)
Oscar De La Hoya vs. Floyd Mayweather (2007)
Floyd Mayweather vs. Ricky Hatton (2007)
Bernard Hopkins vs. Joe Calzaghe (2008)
Ricky Hatton vs. Manny Pacquiao (2009)
Floyd Mayweather vs. Manny Pacquiao (2015)
Canelo Álvarez vs. Amir Khan (2016)
Sergey Kovalev vs. Andre Ward (2016)
Floyd Mayweather vs. Conor McGregor (2017)
Canelo Álvarez vs. Gennady Golovkin (2017)
Canelo Álvarez vs. Gennady Golovkin II (2018)
Deontay Wilder vs. Tyson Fury II (2020)
Deontay Wilder vs. Tyson Fury III (2021)

Golf
Las Vegas hosts two pro tour events:
 PGA Tour Shriners Hospitals for Children Open (historically known as the Las Vegas Invitational)
 PGA Tour Champions Las Vegas Open

The Las Vegas Country Club previously hosted the LPGA Takefuji Classic from 2003 until 2006.

Mixed martial arts
Along with significant rises in popularity in mixed martial arts (MMA), a number of fight leagues such as the premier MMA organization in the world the UFC call Las Vegas home with the headquarters of world operations due to the number of suitable host venues with an annual international fight week held near July 4. The Mandalay Bay Events Center and MGM Grand Garden Arena are among some of the more popular venues for fighting events and have hosted several UFC and other MMA title fights, with the addition of the new T-Mobile Arena.

Motorsports

Las Vegas has become an internationally known motor racing locale, having hosted the elite Formula One racers at Caesars Palace and the Championship Auto Racing Teams (CART) for Indy racers in the early 1980s. Las Vegas is also home to the Mint 400, an off-road race run in the unforgiving Nevada desert outside Las Vegas. During the race's "classic era" from 1967 to 1987, as many as 100,000 spectators lined the 100-mile (160 km) loop to view the 500-plus off-road racing vehicles. Sponsored by Del Webb's Mint Hotel and Casino, the event was the largest and richest event in the sport. The technical and safety inspection was held on famed Fremont Street and became one of the major must-attend sporting events in Las Vegas history. After the 1987 race, the Del Webb organization sold the Mint Hotel to the adjacent Horseshoe owned by the legendary Binion gaming family, and the race was discontinued after the 1989 edition. In 2008, the Mint 400 was revived under new management, and since 2012 it has been held on a completely new 100-mile desert loop.

Over the years, Vegas was the host for the Caesars Palace Grand Prix.

The Can-Am Challenge Cup races in 1966–68 were held at the old Stardust Raceway and were officially called the Stardust Grand Prix.

In July 2006, the Las Vegas City Council approved a 2.44-mile, 14-turn, counterclockwise street circuit in the downtown area for a Champ Car event slated for April 6–8, 2007.

Las Vegas hosts these motor sports at the Las Vegas Motor Speedway:

 NASCAR Cup Series: Pennzoil 400, South Point 400
 NASCAR Xfinity Series: Boyd Gaming 300, DC Solar 300
 NASCAR Truck Series: Strat 200, World of Westgate 200
 Denso Spark Plugs NHRA Nationals (April)
 NHRA Toyota Nationals (November)
 Monster Jam World Finals at Sam Boyd Stadium (March) 

On March 30, 2022, Formula 1 announced the Las Vegas Grand Prix for 2023. This will be the first race to take place on a Saturday night, and will be F1's first visit to Vegas since 1982.

Professional wrestling
Over the years, Las Vegas has housed many wrestling events for WWE such as WrestleMania IX at Caesars Palace, No Way Out (2001) housed at the Thomas & Mack Center, Vengeance (2005), Monday Night Raw, and No Way Out (2008), SummerSlam (2021), and Money in the Bank (2022) pay-per-views at Allegiant Stadium. Las Vegas also hosted World Championship Wrestling's Halloween Havoc from 1996 to 2000 and TNA Wrestling's TNA Impact! along with numerous Ring of Honor Pay Per View and televised events including the 13th and 14th Anniversary Shows, along with Death Before Dishonor XIV and Death Before Dishonor XV. The latest event to be held by a major wrestling organisation was AEW's inaugural Double or Nothing pay-per-view held at the MGM Grand Garden Arena in 2019; the event returned to Las Vegas in 2022 at T-Mobile Arena.

Rodeo
The Professional Rodeo Cowboys Association's National Finals Rodeo at the Thomas & Mack Center has drawn thousands of fans to the city every December since 1985. A contract extension was signed in 2005 keeping the event in Las Vegas through 2014, followed by another extension that will keep the event in Las Vegas through 2025.

The Professional Bull Riders circuit held its annual World Finals in Las Vegas for many years. From 1994 to 1998, the event was held at the MGM Grand Garden Arena; from 1999 to 2015, it was held at the Thomas & Mack Center; from 2016 to 2019, and again in 2021, it was held at T-Mobile Arena.

Las Vegas has hosted several individual professional rodeo events:
 Professional Rodeo Cowboys Association (PRCA) National Finals Rodeo [1985–2019, 2021–present]
 Las Vegas Days Rodeo (PRCA regular season rodeo) 
 International Gay Rodeo Association (IGRA) BigHorn Rodeo [IGRA regular season rodeo] 
 IGRA World Finals 
 Professional Bull Riders (PBR) World Finals [1994–2019, 2021]
 PBR Last Cowboy Standing (PBR Premier Series regular season event) [2011, 2013–2018]
 Indian National Finals Rodeo

Running and triathlon
Rock 'n' Roll Las Vegas Marathon — The marathon was originally organized by Al Boka in 1983, who eventually sold the marathon in 2005 to Devine Racing, a Chicago-based race organization company that is responsible for several other races, including the Los Angeles Marathon.  Devine redubbed the race as "The New Las Vegas Marathon", and updated the course to include the Strip. Introduced on December 4, 2005, the new course marks one of the race occasions that the Strip is closed to traffic. Prior to that, the course had run on the old Los Angeles Highway, beginning in the community of Jean, Nevada, and ending inside Las Vegas proper (Sunset Park). Additionally in 2005, the date of the marathon was changed from January to December to help ensure better weather. In 2009, the Las Vegas Marathon was acquired by the Competitor Group, Inc. and renamed as the Rock 'n' Roll Las Vegas Marathon, as part of the company's Rock 'n' Roll Marathon Series.
Baker to Vegas Challenge Cup Relay – Vegas is the end point for the annual Baker to Vegas Challenge Cup Relay. This 120 mile long foot race is run in April of each year by law enforcement teams from around the world. The race starts in Baker, California and is run over two days. This is the largest law enforcement athletic event in the world.
The World Triathlon Corporation (WTC) had hosted the Ironman 70.3 World Championships in the Las Vegas metropolitan area from 2011 to 2013. The swim portion of the competition is held at Lake Las Vegas, and the bike and run portions are held in the Henderson, Nevada area. In 2014, the race was renamed the Ironman 70.3 Silverman as the championship race began the practice of changing to a new location each year going forward.
The Lake Las Vegas/Henderson, Nevada area was host to the ITU Long Distance Triathlon World Championships on November 5, 2011, and organized by the International Triathlon Union. The venue featured the same course as the previously held Nevada Silverman Triathlon.

Other events
Las Vegas is home to the Tennis Channel Open hosted at Darling Tennis Center. An international series tournament with a $1,000,000 prize fund which attracts stars such as Lleyton Hewitt, James Blake and Las Vegas native Andre Agassi.
In 2006, the city hosted the USAFL National Championships, the biggest event in the United States for the sport of Australian rules football, with over 2,000 players from the US and Canada including local team Las Vegas Gamblers.
The annual Evolution Championship Series fighting game event – which holds the largest fighting game tournaments in the world – has been hosted in Las Vegas since its rebranding in 2002.
Las Vegas is home to the professional paintball team Las Vegas LTZ and amateur team Sin City Paintball.
Las Vegas is home of the American Ninja Warrior national finals since season 4, which resembles the Mt. Midoriyama course from its Japanese TV series Sasuke. Here, 90 competitors from around the country compete in this city to earn the title of American Ninja Warrior champion and the cash prize of $1,000,000.
eSports organization Major League Gaming hosted an MLG gaming event in Las Vegas from 2006 to 2008, featuring competitive Halo, Call of Duty, and other gaming tournaments. Las Vegas will be hosting an MLG event called MLG Vegas from December 16-18th. 2016.
Las Vegas was the host city for three major figure skating events, held at the Orleans Arena: 2019 Skate America, 2020 Skate America, and the 2021 U.S. Figure Skating Championships. The Orleans Arena was also the planned site for the 2021 U.S. Synchronized Skating Championships, which was canceled due to the COVID-19 pandemic.
Since 2022, T-Mobile Arena in Las Vegas has been home of the Professional Bull Riders Team Series Championship.

Sports venues

Arenas
City National Arena
Cox Pavilion
Dollar Loan Center
Las Vegas Ice Center
Lifeguard Arena
MGM Grand Garden Arena
Michelob Ultra Arena
MSG Sphere Las Vegas (2021)
Orleans Arena
Sobe Ice Arena
South Point Events Center
Tarkanian Basketball Center
Thomas & Mack Center
T-Mobile Arena

Golf courses
Primm Valley Golf Club 
Rio Secco Golf Club
Shadow Creek Golf Club – Private
TPC Las Vegas (formerly TPC at The Canyons)
TPC at Summerlin – Private
Wynn Golf and Country Club
Rhodes Ranch Golf Club
Chimera Golf Club
Badlands
The Club at Sunrise
Las Vegas Golf Club

Motor sports
Las Vegas Motor Speedway

Sports fields
Allegiant Stadium 
Bettye Wilson Soccer Complex
Cashman Field
Sam Boyd Stadium
Las Vegas Ballpark

See also
Las Vegas Desert Classic (darts)
Fabulous Sin City Rollergirls (WFTDA) (roller derby)
Sports in Nevada

Notes

References